Cadwaladr ap Gruffydd (c. 1100 – 1172) was the third son of Gruffudd ap Cynan, King of Gwynedd, and brother of Owain Gwynedd.

Appearance in history
Cadwaladr first appears in the historical record in 1136, when following the killing of the lord of Ceredigion, Richard Fitz Gilbert de Clare, he accompanied his brother Owain Gwynedd in an invasion of Ceredigion. They captured five castles in the north of Ceredigion then later in the year launched a second invasion, inflicting a heavy defeat on the Normans at the Battle of Crug Mawr, just outside Cardigan. In 1137 they captured Carmarthen.  He later married Richard Fitz Gilbert de Clare's daughter Alice (Adelize) de Clare and had issue with her.

Gruffudd ap Cynan died in 1137 and was succeeded by Owain Gwynedd, his eldest surviving son. Cadwaladr was given lands in northern Ceredigion. Cadwaladr joined with Ranulph, Earl of Chester in the attack on Lincoln in 1141, when King Stephen of England was taken prisoner. This alliance was probably linked to Cadwaladr's marriage to Alice de Clare, daughter of Richard Fitz Gilbert de Clare.

In 1143 Cadwaladr's men killed Anarawd ap Gruffydd of Deheubarth by treachery, apparently on Cadwaladr's orders. Owain Gwynedd responded by sending his son Hywel ab Owain Gwynedd to deprive Cadwaladr of his lands in Ceredigion. Cadwaladr fled to Ireland where he hired a fleet from Óttar the Norse-Gael king of Dublin and landed at Abermenai in 1144 in an attempt to force Owain to return his lands. Cadwaladr apparently abandoned or escaped from his allies and made peace with his brother, who obliged the Dubliners to leave.

In 1147 Hywel ab Owain Gwynedd and his brother Cynan drove Cadwaladr from his remaining lands in Meirionnydd. A further quarrel with his brother Owain led to Cadwaladr being driven into exile in England, where King Henry II later gave him lands at Ness in Shropshire.

Henry II's time
When Henry II invaded Gwynedd in 1157 the terms of the peace agreement between him and Owain Gwynedd included the stipulation that Cadwaladr should be given back his lands. From this time on Cadwaladr was careful to cooperate closely with his brother, helping him to capture Rhuddlan and Prestatyn castles in 1167.

Cadwaladr survived his brother by two years, dying in 1172. He was buried alongside Owain in Bangor Cathedral.

Children
Cadwaladr had seven sons with three different wives.

With his first wife Gwerfel ferch Gwrgan, he had:
Cadfan ap Cadwaladr

With his second wife Alice de Clare, he had:
Cunedda ap Cadwaladr
Rhicert ap Cadwaladr
Ralph ap Cadwaladr

With his third wife Tangwystl, he had:
Cadwgan ap Cadwaladr
Maredudd ap Cadwaladr
Cadwallon ap Cadwaladr

Fiction
Cadwaladr's attempt to reclaim his lands with the help of a Danish fleet in 1144 forms the background to The Summer of the Danes by Ellis Peters in the Brother Cadfael series.

Notes

Sources 

John Burke, Sir Bernard Burke (1850) A genealogical and heraldic dictionary of the landed gentry of Great Britain. London: H. Colburn
John Edward Lloyd (1911) The history of Wales from the earliest times to the Edwardian conquest (Longmans, Green & Co.)

Welsh princes
History of Wales
Year of birth uncertain
1090s births
1172 deaths
House of Aberffraw
People of The Anarchy
12th-century Welsh people
Welsh people of Irish descent